The 1921–22 Hong Kong First Division League season was the 14th since its establishment.

Overview
HMS Curlew and HKFC both finished level atop the table on 29 points resulting in a play-off to determine the league champions on 22 April 1922. HMS Curiew won the match 1–0.

References

Hong Kong First Division League
1922 in Hong Kong
1921 in Hong Kong
Hong Kong First Division League seasons
Hong Kong
Hong Kong